"Querido Corazón" is an electropop song co-written by Zemmoa and Alfredo Cabello. Produced by Alfredo Cabello Soto.

Music video 
The music video shows Zemmoa dancing alone in an empty discoteque.

Appearances 
Zemmoa presents her new Concert tour "Lo que tour me haces sentir" at Foro Indie Rocks with Noa Sainz, La Bruja de Texcoco, Manu Nna (Stand-up comedy), Mancandy (singer), hosted by Amelia Waldorf (drag queen).

Release
During LGBT Pride Month, she announced new single "Querido corazón" on a Proust Questionnaire.

Credits and personnel
Zemmoa and Alfredo Cabello - Songwriters
Alfredo Cabello, Ben Daval (Los Master Plus) - record producer
Arturo “Tibu” Santillanes - saxophone
Leonardo Villegas - violin 
Noa Sainz and Alfredo Cabello - backing vocalists
Oscar Amato and Noa Sainz - audio engineers
Alberto Hernández - remix
Cem Oral - mastering (audio)
Juan Retallack - album cover
Francisco Tostado - graphic design
Lucía Anaya (aka Uchi o Derre Tidá) - talent management
Altafonte - record distribution
Maria Ponce - fashion designer
Emilio Bianchic Generación Galáctica - Film director

References 

2022 singles
2022 songs
Spanish-language songs